Bulgurluk is a village in the Genç District, Bingöl Province, Turkey. The village is populated by Kurds of the Botikan tribe and had a population of 100 in 2021.

The hamlets of Bağbaşı, Demiroğlu, Kilimli, Kirişli, Konacık, Okçular, Savaş, Taşkapı, Yazmalı and Yıldızlı are attached to the village.

References 

Villages in Genç District
Kurdish settlements in Bingöl Province